Íngrid Reich Rincón (born 12 June 1973) is a Mexican former synchronized swimmer who competed in the 1996 Summer Olympics. She is the sister of Aline Reich.

References

1973 births
Living people
Mexican synchronized swimmers
Olympic synchronized swimmers of Mexico
Synchronized swimmers at the 1996 Summer Olympics